Port Angeles is a city and county seat of Clallam County, Washington, United States.  With a population of 19,960 as of the 2020 census, it is the largest city in the county. The population was estimated at 20,134 in 2021.

The city's harbor was dubbed  (Port of Our Lady of the Angels) by Spanish explorer  in 1791. By the mid-19th century, after settlement by English speakers from the United States, the name was shortened and partially anglicized to its current form, Port Angeles Harbor.

Port Angeles is home to Peninsula College. It is the birthplace of football hall of famer John Elway and residents include writers and artists. The city is served by William R. Fairchild International Airport. Ferry service is provided across the Strait of Juan de Fuca to Victoria, British Columbia, Canada on the MV Coho.

History

This area was long occupied by succeeding cultures of indigenous peoples. In 1791, the harbor was entered by Spanish explorer , who named it  (Port of Our Lady of the Angels), claiming it for Spain. He was on an expedition from southern California. This name was shortened to the current one of Port Angeles.

It was not until the 19th century that European Americans began to settle here. A small whaling, fishing and shipping village developed, which traded with Victoria, British Columbia. In 1856–57, the first settlers arrived and were followed by the Cherbourg Land Company in 1859.

Soon afterwards the site caught the attention of Victor Smith.  Smith, a protege of Salmon Chase, was Collector of Customs for the Puget Sound District. He quickly gained approval to relocate the U.S. Customs port of entry for Washington Territory from Port Townsend to Port Angeles. With Chase's support, he also succeeded in getting President Abraham Lincoln to designate  at Port Angeles as a federal reserve for lighthouse, military and naval purposes. 
The U.S. Army Corps of Engineers platted a federal town site on the reserve land, laying out the street plan which still exists today. The fact that Washington, D.C., was the only other city officially laid out by the federal government led the U.S. Board of Trade in 1890 to dub Port Angeles the "Second National City." Settlers soon followed slowly, but Smith's death in the sinking of the Brother Jonathen led to the loss of interest in the area. The Port of Entry was returned to Port Townsend and the area sank into obscurity until the 1880s.

In 1884, a hotel was built and the trading post was expanded into the areas first general store. A wharf was soon built upon that site that the current ferry pier stands.  A village of 300 in 1886, Port Angeles' population grew to 3,000 by 1890. Hundreds of its new residents were part of the Puget Sound Cooperative Colony, which was established in 1887 and built several of the settlement's first permanent civic facilities, including a sawmill, church, office building, and opera house. The town was incorporated on June 11, 1890, and was named the county seat of Clallam County later that year. A depression a few years later was weathered and the town continued to grow into the new century. In 1914, large-scale logging began with construction of a large mill and a railway connecting the hinterlands to the mill. Other mills were soon built and the lumber and pulp mills supported the economy of the area until well into the century.

Tourism became increasingly important as the growing national affluence, and especially the 1961 opening of the Hood Canal Bridge that cut driving time from the populated central Puget Sound region, brought more visitors drawn by the mountains, rivers, and rainforest of Olympic National Park and by fishing and boating along the Strait of Juan de Fuca. The mills began to close in the 1970s and 1980s until only one pulp mill remained in operation; the Rayonier specialty pulp mill was shuttered in 1997.

In August 2003, a $275 million construction project known as the Graving Dock Project was started in Port Angeles near the water as part of the Hood Canal Bridge east-half replacement project. It was intended to construct an area for anchoring pontoons for the bridge. During construction, human remains and artifacts were discovered. This site was found to be the "largest prehistoric Indian village and burial ground found in the United States," according to a senior archaeologist for the U.S. Army Corps of Engineers in Seattle. The archeology site also included Native American burials of the late 18th and early 19th centuries.

Archeologists were called in to conduct a professional excavation. They found about 300 graves and 785 pieces of human bones, in addition to numerous ritual and ceremonial Indian artifacts of the former Tse-whit-zen village of the federally recognized Lower Elwha Klallam Tribe. This site had appeared to have been continuously occupied for thousands of years; some of the remains date back at least 8,000 years. Because of the significance of the site for Native American history, in December 2004, the graving dock project was abandoned.

Many of the graves uncovered appeared to hold entire families, who seemed to have died suddenly. Archeologists speculate that this could have been the result of pandemics of smallpox and other infectious illnesses. These caused massive death tolls among Native American populations in 1780 and 1835, as they had no acquired immunity. Infectious diseases contracted from interactions with European fur traders are believed to have killed about 90 percent of the people living in the Northwest before European American settlement of the area.

In 2016, Port Angeles installed two street signs in English and Klallam to revitalize and preserve the area's Klallam culture.

Geography

The coordinates of Port Angeles are 48°06′47″N 123°26′27″W (48.112969, -123.440713).

The city is situated on the northern edge of the Olympic Peninsula along the shore of the Strait of Juan de Fuca. Port Angeles features a long and narrow glacial moraine named Ediz Hook that projects northeasterly nearly three miles into the Strait. Ediz Hook creates a large, natural deep-water harbor shielded from the storms and swells that move predominantly eastward down the Strait from the Pacific Ocean.  Coast Guard Air Station / Sector Field Office (SFO) Port Angeles is situated on the end of Ediz Hook.  The harbor is deep enough to provide anchorage for large ocean-going ships such as tankers and cruise ships.  The south shore of Vancouver Island and the city of Victoria, British Columbia are visible across the Strait to the north.

Port Angeles is located in the rain shadow of the Olympic Mountains, which means the city gets significantly less rain than other areas of western Washington. Temperatures are moderated by the maritime location, with winter lows rarely below  and summer highs rarely above . However, in the winter, the city can be vulnerable to windstorms and Arctic cold fronts that sweep across the Strait of Juan de Fuca.

Port Angeles is also the location of the headquarters of Olympic National Park, which encompasses most of the Olympic Mountains. This park was established by President Franklin D. Roosevelt in 1938, during the Great Depression.

Climate
Port Angeles has a mediterranean climate (Köppen Csb). It is heavily moderated by the Pacific Ocean, resulting in cool summers and mild winters for its latitude. Summers are far cooler than those of nearby Seattle.

Demographics

2020 census
As of the census of 2020, there were 19,960 people, 8,783 households, and 4,826 families residing in the city. The racial makeup of the city was 86.9% White, 1.5% African American, 2.8% Native American, 2.5% Asian, 0.2% Pacific Islander, 1.4% from other races, and 5.2% from two or more races. Hispanic or Latino of any race were 6.6% of the population.

The median age in the city was 38.9 years. 21.2% of residents were under the age of 18; 8.3% were between the ages of 18 and 24; 26.1% were from 25 to 44; 23.1% were from 45 to 64; and 21.3% were 65 years of age or older. The gender makeup of the city was 48.9% male and 51.1% female.

2010 census
As of the census of 2010, there were 19,038 people, 8,459 households, and 4,808 families residing in the city. The racial makeup of the city was 88.9% White, 0.8% African American, 3.2% Native American, 1.8% Asian, 0.2% Pacific Islander, 0.9% from other races, and 4.3% from two or more races. Hispanic or Latino of any race were 4.0% of the population.

There were 8,459 households, of which 25.7% had children under the age of 18 living with them, 39.9% were married couples living together, 11.8% had a female householder with no husband present, 5.1% had a male householder with no wife present, and 43.2% were non-families. 35.5% of all households were made up of individuals, and 14.6% had someone living alone who was 65 years of age or older. The average household size was 2.19 and the average family size was 2.79.

The median age in the city was 41.6 years. 20.6% of residents were under the age of 18; 9.7% were between the ages of 18 and 24; 23.4% were from 25 to 44; 28.3% were from 45 to 64; and 18% were 65 years of age or older. The gender makeup of the city was 48.6% male and 51.4% female.

2000 census
As of the census of 2000, there were 18,397 people, 8,053 households, and 4,831 families residing in the city. The population density was 1,823.1 people per square mile (704.0/km2). There were 8,682 housing units at an average density of 860.4 per square mile (332.2/km2). The racial makeup of the city was 91.35% White, 0.69% Black, 3.26% Native American, 1.29% Asian, 0.17% Pacific Islander, 0.38% from other races, and 2.85% from two or more races. Hispanic or Latino of any race were 2.34% of the population.

There were 8,053 households, out of which 28.1% had children under the age of 18 living with them, 44.0% were married couples living together, 12.2% had a female householder with no husband present, and 40.0% were non-families.  34.0% of all households were made up of individuals, and 15.2% had someone living alone who was 65 years of age or older. The average household size was 2.24 and the average family size was 2.84.

In the city, the age distribution of the population shows 23.7% under the age of 18, 8.6% from 18 to 24, 25.4% from 25 to 44, 23.9% from 45 to 64, and 18.4% who were 65 years of age or older. The median age was 40 years. For every 100 females, there were 92.1 males. For every 100 females age 18 and over, there were 87.6 males.

The median income for a household in the city was US$33,130, and the median income for a family was $41,450. Males had a median income of $33,351 versus $25,215 for females. The per capita income for the city was $17,903. About 9.9% of families and 13.2% of the population were below the poverty line, including 17.3% of those under age 18 and 6.7% of those age 65 or over.

Media

The local newspaper is the Peninsula Daily News, originally the Port Angeles Evening News (founded 1916). The Peninsula Daily News publishes six days a week and hosts a website for the North Olympic Peninsula.

Newsradio 1450 KONP is a local radio station offering news, sports, information and talk programming on AM 1450. The station is also broadcast on FM 101.7 (founded 1945).

The Strait 102 KSTI is an FM radio station playing country music. KSTI is located at FM 102.1

Port Angeles is the home base of Rygaard Logging, one of the logging companies featured in the second season of the History Channel program Ax Men.

The Strait of Juan de Fuca north of Port Angeles was used for filming some of the open water scenes in the 1990 film The Hunt for Red October. Port Angeles was also used in the last scene of the 1994 movie Wyatt Earp when Wyatt and Josie were on the boat out from the harbor with the Olympic Mountains in the distance.

Education

Public school education is provided by the Port Angeles School District which operates five elementary schools, one middle school, a high school, an alternative high school and a vocational school. In addition, there are two private schools, Queen of Angels Catholic School and Olympic Christian School, both of which serve grades K-8.

Peninsula College is a community college based in Port Angeles that serves the Olympic Peninsula.

Sister city
 Mutsu, Aomori, Japan, is a sister city of Port Angeles. The cities have an exchange student program set up through the Port Angeles School District.

Notable people
 Bryan Suits, radio host, podcaster, US Army combat veteran, historian
 Scott Bower, former Major League Soccer player, San Jose Clash
 Harold G. Bradbury, U.S. Coast Guard Rear Admiral
 Raymond Carver, author
 Casey Crescenzo, musician
 Matthew Dryke, former international shooter and Olympic gold medalist
 John Elway, National Football League, former player for the Denver Broncos
 Bernie Fryer, NBA/ABA basketball player with the Portland Trail Blazers, Spirits of St. Louis and the New Orleans Jazz. After his playing days he became a long-time NBA referee
 Tess Gallagher, author
 Patrick Haggerty, country singer
 Derek Kilmer, U.S. Congressman
 Sean Mac Falls, poet
 Ellie Mathews, children's writer
 Jim Michalczik, football coach for the University of Arizona Wildcats, and Oakland Raiders, former NFL player with the Arizona Cardinals
 Robert Hopkins Miller, diplomat
 Jeff Ridgway, Major League Baseball player for the Tampa Bay Devil Rays, Atlanta Braves, Washington Nationals
 Arnie Roblan, politician
 Amelia Talon, Playboy Playmate

See also
 Juan Carrasco (explorer)
 Tse-whit-zen

References

External links

 
 City of Port Angeles Website
 Visit Port Angeles - Official Visitor Site for the City of Port Angeles
 Peninsula Daily News Website
 Olympic National Park
 North Olympic Discovery Marathon
 North Olympic Library System
 Port Angeles Chamber of Commerce
 University of Washington Libraries Digital Collections – The Pacific Northwest Olympic Peninsula Community Museum
 HistoryLink.org - Port Angeles - Thumbnail History

 
Cities in Washington (state)
Cities in Clallam County, Washington
County seats in Washington (state)
Micropolitan areas of Washington (state)
Populated coastal places in Washington (state)